Cole Douglas Young (born July 29, 2003) is an American professional baseball shortstop in the Seattle Mariners organization.

Amateur career
Young was raised in Wexford, Pennsylvania. In 2014, he won Major League Baseball’s national Pitch, Hit & Run competition for the 9-10-year-old division. Young attended North Allegheny High School. His sophomore season was canceled due to COVID-19. As a junior, Young batted .437 with 33 runs scored, 23 RBIs and 14 extra-base hits. Following the season, Young played in the Major League Baseball and USA Baseball High School All-American Game at Coors Field during the 2021 Major League Baseball All-Star Weekend. He committed to play college baseball at Duke as a freshman in high school.

Professional career
Young was considered a top prospect for the 2022 Major League Baseball draft. The Seattle Mariners selected Young in the first round of the draft, with the 21st overall selection. He signed with the Mariners on July 26, 2022, and received a $3.3 million signing bonus.

References

External links

Baseball players from Pennsylvania
Baseball shortstops
Living people
2003 births
Arizona Complex League Mariners players
Modesto Nuts players